Eliolona was an Italian professional cycling team that existed only for the 1969 season. The team competed in the 1969 Giro d'Italia. Their main rider was Spanish cyclist Julio Jiménez.

References

Defunct cycling teams based in Italy
1969 establishments in Italy
1969 disestablishments in Italy
Cycling teams established in 1969
Cycling teams disestablished in 1969